Anastasia Alexandrovna Dolidze (born 26 September 1997) is a Russian pair skater. With Vadim Ivanov, she is the 2012 Winter Youth Olympics bronze medalist. Dolidze teamed up with Ivanov in 2011, after skating two seasons with Igor Chudin.

Programs 
(with Ivanov)

Competitive highlights

With Ivanov

With Chudin

References

External links 
 

Russian female pair skaters
1997 births
Living people
Figure skaters from Moscow
Figure skaters at the 2012 Winter Youth Olympics
20th-century Russian women
21st-century Russian women